This list is of the Places of Scenic Beauty of Japan located within the Prefecture of Ibaraki.

National Places of Scenic Beauty
As of 1 June 2022, five Places have been designated at a national level.

Prefectural Places of Scenic Beauty
As of 1 January 2022, five Places have been designated at a prefectural level.

Municipal Places of Scenic Beauty
As of 1 May 2021, twelve Places have been designated at a municipal level.

Registered Places of Scenic Beauty
As of 1 June 2022, one Monument has been registered (as opposed to designated) as a Place of Scenic Beauty at a national level.

See also
 Cultural Properties of Japan
 List of parks and gardens of Ibaraki Prefecture
 List of Historic Sites of Japan (Ibaraki)
 List of Cultural Properties of Japan - paintings (Ibaraki)

References

External links
  National Cultural Properties in Ibaraki Prefecture
  Prefectural Cultural Properties in Ibaraki Prefecture

Tourist attractions in Ibaraki Prefecture
Places of Scenic Beauty